Peter Nathan Fiorentino (born December 22, 1968) is a Canadian former professional ice hockey defenceman who played in one National Hockey League game for the New York Rangers during the 1991–92 NHL season. His sole game was played against the Los Angeles Kings, in which he was credited with two shots on goal but did not record any points.

Career statistics

See also
List of players who played only one game in the NHL

External links

1968 births
Canadian people of Italian descent
Binghamton Rangers players
Canadian ice hockey defencemen
Denver Rangers players
Flint Spirits players
Hartford Wolf Pack players
Ice hockey people from Ontario
Indianapolis Ice players
Las Vegas Thunder players
Living people
New York Rangers draft picks
New York Rangers players
Quebec Rafales players
Sault Ste. Marie Greyhounds players
Sportspeople from Niagara Falls, Ontario